The Poetry Project at St. Mark's Church was founded in 1966 at St. Mark's Church in-the-Bowery in the East Village of Manhattan by, among others, the poet and translator Paul Blackburn. It has been a crucial venue for new and experimental poetry for more than five decades.

The Project offers a number of reading series, writing workshops, a quarterly newsletter, a website, and audio and document archives, and the church has been the site of memorial readings for poets Paul Blackburn, Allen Ginsberg, Michael Scholnick, W.H. Auden, Frank O'Hara, Liv Mammone, Ted Berrigan, and others.

The Project is staffed completely by poets. Artistic Directors and coordinators of the project have included Joel Oppenheimer, Anne Waldman, Bernadette Mayer, Bob Holman. Ron Padgett, Eileen Myles, Ed Friedman – whose term from 1986 to 2003 was the longest – Anselm Berrigan, Stacy Szymaszek and the incumbent director Kyle Dacuyan.

Public Access Poetry 
From 1977 until 1978, the New York public-access television show Public Access Poetry (PAP) showed readings at the project featuring poets such as Ted Berrigan, Ron Padgett, Eileen Myles, John Yau, Brad Gooch, Alice Notley, Jim Brodey, and more. On the show performers and poets gave half-hour readings. In 2011, after launching a successful Kickstarter campaign, The Poetry Project was able to restore, preserve and digitize all of the remaining film. In April 2011 with the Anthology Film Archives they presented screenings of highlights of the PAP films.

References

External links
 

American poetry
Poetry organizations
1966 establishments in New York City
Organizations based in New York (state)
Arts organizations established in 1966